Ili Tugaga (born 16 February 1990) is a New Zealand cricketer. He played in 27 first-class, 10 List A, and 5 Twenty20 matches for Wellington from 2009 and 2015.

See also
 List of Wellington representative cricketers

References

External links
 

1990 births
Living people
New Zealand cricketers
Wellington cricketers
Cricketers from Wellington City